Central Presbyterian Church (also known as First Presbyterian Church) is a historic church at 1100 Harrison Street in Amarillo, Texas.

It was built in a Late Gothic Revival, Tudor Revival style and was added to the National Register in 1991.

See also

National Register of Historic Places listings in Potter County, Texas

References

External links

Presbyterian churches in Texas
Churches on the National Register of Historic Places in Texas
Tudor Revival architecture in Texas
Gothic Revival church buildings in Texas
Churches in Potter County, Texas
Buildings and structures in Amarillo, Texas
National Register of Historic Places in Potter County, Texas